Varkala Taluk is a Taluk (tehsil) in Thiruvananthapuram district in the Indian state of Kerala. It is the 3rd most densely populated taluk in the district comprising 10 villages and Varkala municipality.
Spanning an area of about 171km²,Varkala Taluk is home to over 9% of total population of Trivandrum district. Varkala is the taluk headquarters and the largest town of the taluk.

Revenue villages
Varkala (M)
Edava
Pallickal
Navaikulam
Chemmaruthy
Cherunniyoor - Vettoor
Kudavoor
Manamboor
Ottoor
Madavoor
Ayiroor
 Vettoor

Educational institutions
 SN College Varkala
SR Medical College Akathumuri
Sree Shankara Dental College
SN Nursing College Varkala
VK College of Engineering and Technology Chavercode
SN Training College Nedunganda
 Asan Memorial Training Institute Vettoor
 CHMM College Chavercode
University Institute of Management Varkala
Govt ITI Varkala
Govt ITI Varkala (SC)
 University Institute of Technology Pallickal

Railway stations

 Varkala
 Edava
 Kappil
 Akathumuri

Transportation

Road
NH66 is passing through the Varkala Taluk connecting major cities in India like Mumbai, Trivandrum, Mangalore, Kochi etc.

SH64 originating from Varkala City connect major towns in Kollam district.

Trivandrum - Kasargod Coastal Highway is passing through the Varkala Town.

Rail
Taluk consist of 1 major (Varkala) and 3 minor (Kappil, Edava, Akathumuri) railway stations.
Varkala railway station serving the taluk is 2nd busiest in the district after Trivandrum Central Railway Station and 8th busiest railway station in the Trivandrum division.
Varkala Railway Station is well connected to major cities & towns in India like Delhi, Hyderabad, Mumbai, Pune, Goa, Kolkata, Bangalore, Chennai, Visakhapatnam, Trivandrum, Kochi, Madurai, Coimbatore, Bhopal, Vijayawada, Nilambur etc.

Air
Trivandrum International Airport is 39 km from Varkala Town is the nearest airport for Varkala Taluk.
Varkala also has its own helipad in the town built in 1980.

References

Varkala